The Palace Casino and Hotel is a Casino and Hotel owned and run by the Leech Lake Band Of Ojibwe in Cass Lake, Minnesota.

External links
 Palace Casino and Hotel

Buildings and structures in Cass County, Minnesota
Tourist attractions in Cass County, Minnesota
Casinos in Minnesota
Native American casinos
Casino hotels
Native American history of Minnesota